Cecilia Roxana Tait Villacorta (born May 2, 1962) is a Peruvian politician and retired volleyball player.

Sports career
Nicknamed La Zurda del Oro (The Golden Left-Handed Woman), Tait participated in three Summer Olympics with the Peru national team, finishing 6th in 1980, 4th in 1984 and winning a silver medal at the 1988 Summer Olympics in Seoul. She was a member of the Peruvian team that won second place in the World Championship in 1982, and third place at the World Championship in 1986. She won a silver medal at the 1979 Pan American Games in San Juan, a bronze medal at the 1983 Pan American Games in Caracas, and a silver medal at the 1987 Pan American Games in Indianapolis.

Political career
In 1998, Cecilia Tait entered politics, becoming elected municipal councillor in Villa María del Triunfo, representing the Fujimorist party Vamos Vecino of President Alberto Fujimori. Tait was elected Congresswoman in 2000, representing Perú Posible. She was the first Afro-Peruvian elected to Peru's Congress. The resignation of President Alberto Fujimori led to new elections the following year in which she was reelected for the period 2001–2006. Tait sponsored several bills approved by the Congress that expanded sports programs for both the country's most talented athletes and poor school children as well. She failed to attain reelection in 2006, but she was re-elected to Congress in 2011 and left office in 2016 after she failed to attain reelection under the Peruvians for Change party.

References

External links

1962 births
Living people
Olympic volleyball players of Peru
Pan American Games silver medalists for Peru
Pan American Games bronze medalists for Peru
Volleyball players at the 1980 Summer Olympics
Volleyball players at the 1984 Summer Olympics
Volleyball players at the 1988 Summer Olympics
Volleyball players at the 1979 Pan American Games
Volleyball players at the 1983 Pan American Games
Volleyball players at the 1987 Pan American Games
Olympic silver medalists for Peru
Sportspeople from Lima
Possible Peru politicians
Fujimorista politicians
Members of the Congress of the Republic of Peru
Peruvian sportsperson-politicians
Peruvian women's volleyball players
Olympic medalists in volleyball
Medalists at the 1988 Summer Olympics
Pan American Games medalists in volleyball
Medalists at the 1979 Pan American Games
Medalists at the 1983 Pan American Games
Medalists at the 1987 Pan American Games
Women members of the Congress of the Republic of Peru